William Elliott (30 May 1872 – 12 December 1944) was a Progressive Party member of the House of Commons of Canada. He was born in Galt, Ontario and became a farmer.

The son of Andrew Elliott and Mary Common, he was educated at Galt Collegiate and the Ontario Agricultural College. Elliott married Eva Croll.

Elliot served as a councillor for Waterloo County, Ontario and was reeve of North Dumfries Township.

He was elected to Parliament at the Waterloo South riding in the 1921 general election. After serving his only federal term, Elliot was defeated in the 1925 federal election by Alexander Edwards of the Conservative party.

Electoral record

References

1872 births
1944 deaths
Canadian farmers
Members of the House of Commons of Canada from Ontario
Ontario municipal councillors
Progressive Party of Canada MPs
Politicians from Cambridge, Ontario